Silvinho Randy Esajas (born 10 September 2002) is a Dutch professional footballer who plays as a defender for ADO Den Haag.

Club career
Esajas joined the Zeeburgia youth academy in 2009 at the age of 7, before moving to Hellas Verona in 2019. On 1 September 2020, Esajas signed a professional contract with ADO Den Haag. Esajas made his debut with ADO Den Haag in a 4–1 Eredivisie loss to FC Utrecht on 4 April 2021.

References

External links
 

2002 births
Living people
Dutch footballers
Dutch sportspeople of Surinamese descent
Association football defenders
ADO Den Haag players
Eredivisie players
Dutch expatriate footballers
Dutch expatriate sportspeople in Italy
Expatriate footballers in Italy